Andrés Romero is the name of:

Andrés Romero, Argentine golfer
Andrés Romero (Argentine footballer)
Andrés Romero (Chilean footballer)
Andrés Romero (Venezuelan footballer)